John Freeston (1512 – 1594) was a barrister from Altofts, West Yorkshire, admitted in 1544 to Gray's Inn in London. Possibly inspired by Walter Midway, Freeston posthumously left £500 to fund a school in Normanton, with a scholarship program in place to allow students from Normanton to gain a place at Emmanuel College, Cambridge (the scholarship was later transferred to Sidney Sussex College in 1607). The will allowed for £25 of this funding to go to the school each year, enough to pay for its construction and its school master's salary. The school did not stay open long enough to use up this funding, however, and an investigation in 1890 revealed it had inflated to £400 per annum. It was decided that the town would use this funding to set up a secondary school, now the Freeston Academy.

See also 
 Grade I listed buildings in West Yorkshire

References 

Founders of English schools and colleges
English philanthropists
Members of Gray's Inn
1512 births
1594 deaths
16th-century English people
People from Normanton, West Yorkshire